Sean Karam (born 24 August 1969) is an Australian former professional tennis player of Lebanese descent.

Karam, who grew up in Sydney, competed on the satellite tour and debuted for the Lebanon Davis Cup team at the age of 27 in 1997. He played in the Davis Cup until 2002 and now works as a tennis coach in Shanghai.

References

External links
 
 
 

1969 births
Living people
Australian male tennis players
Lebanese male tennis players
Australian people of Lebanese descent
Tennis players from Sydney